is a railway station located in the city of Ishinomaki, Miyagi Prefecture, Japan, operated by East Japan Railway Company (JR East).

Lines
Sobanokami Station is served by the Ishinomaki Line, and is located 23.7 kilometers from the terminus of the line at Kogota Station.

Station layout
The station has one side platform, serving a single bi-directional track. The station is unattended.

History
Sobanokami Station opened on April 5, 1956. The station was absorbed into the JR East network upon the privatization of JNR on April 1, 1987. Operations of the line and the station were suspended by the 2011 Tōhoku earthquake and tsunami of March 11, 2011. Services were resumed on March 17, 2013.

Surrounding area

See also
 List of railway stations in Japan

External links

 

Railway stations in Miyagi Prefecture
Ishinomaki Line
Railway stations in Japan opened in 1956
Ishinomaki
Stations of East Japan Railway Company